Nathan James Sykes (born 18 April 1993) is an English singer, best known as a member of the boy band The Wanted. In 2013, Sykes appeared with his bandmates in the E! channel reality television series The Wanted Life. After the band's hiatus in 2014, Sykes embarked on a solo career. His debut single, "Kiss Me Quick" was released in July 2015. It reached number-one on the US Dance Club Songs chart.

Early life
Sykes was born on 18 April 1993 in Gloucester to Harry and Karen Sykes. He has a younger sister, Jessica Sykes, who is also a singer. Sykes attended Sylvia Young Theatre School and Ribston Hall High School sixth form.

Sykes started singing when he was six years old. In 2002 and 2003, he won various competitions, including Britney Spears Karaoke on The Saturday Show and one of the categories at the Cheltenham Competitive Festival of Dramatic Art. In 2004, he appeared on ITV's Ministry of Mayhem, and won the Door Youth Project's "Undiscovered Youth Talent Contest" where he performed "Mack the Knife" in Stroud, and he attempted to represent United Kingdom in the Junior Eurovision Song Contest 2004 that was held in Lillehammer. In the finals, he finished in third place with the song, "Born to Dance", behind Cory Spedding and runner-up Andrew Merry. In 2008, he performed for the music competition "Live and Unsigned".

Career

2009–2014: The Wanted

In 2009, at the age of 16, Sykes auditioned for the boy band The Wanted. The auditions were held by Jayne Collins. Sykes was chosen to be one of those five members for a group. He joined bandmates Max George, Siva Kaneswaran, Tom Parker and Jay McGuiness. The band achieved 10 UK top 10 singles as well as 3 UK top 10 albums. The group has sold more than 12 million records worldwide. After enjoying much mainstream international success, in 2014, the band decided to take a break and pursue their personal endeavours after a tour of the United Kingdom and the United States.

At the same time, Sykes and American singer Ariana Grande released their collaborative single, "Almost Is Never Enough". In 2014, Sykes signed a record deal with Global Entertainment (a part of the Global Group, along with Capital's owner Global Radio). In June 2014, he joined singer Jessie J onstage for Capital's Summertime Ball to perform "Calling All Hearts".

Sykes reunited with his band mates on 20 September 2021, seven years since their hiatus in support of band mate Tom Parker for his charity concert 'Tom Parker: Inside My Head' in aid of raising money for Stand Up To Cancer and The National Brain Appeal at the Royal Albert Hall.

The Wanted's first record since 2014; Rule The World will be released 13 September 2021 to accompany their greatest hits record 'Most Wanted - The Greatest Hits' out 12 November 2021.

2015–present: Unfinished Business
In March 2015, Sykes debuted his first solo music video for "More Than You'll Ever Know" on Vevo. Sykes went on his first solo tour on 8 April 2015, which included six sold-out shows in the United Kingdom. Sykes announced via the app Periscope that his debut single would be called "Kiss Me Quick". The single was released on 5 July 2015. On 21 May 2015, Sykes released his music video for his debut single, "Kiss Me Quick" on Vevo. The song peaked at number 14 on the UK Singles Chart.

In October 2015, Sykes announced his second single, called "Over and Over Again". The music video for the song was released in the UK on 28 October 2015. It was released worldwide on 20 November 2015. It was also announced that Sykes would support Little Mix on their The Get Weird Tour in March 2016. Sykes announced that his third single, called "Give It Up", would be released on 13 May 2016. The music video for "Give It Up" was released on 27 April 2016, and was later banned from television after featuring numerous scenes which came across as unsuitable for most audiences.

On 11 June 2016, Sykes performed at Capital's Summertime Ball for the seventh consecutive time (2010, 2011, 2012, 2013 with The Wanted, 2014 as Jessie J's guest, 2015 and 2016 as a solo performer).

On 11 July 2016, Sykes announced via Twitter that he would be joining Alessia Cara on her Know-It-All headling tour in the United States. On 12 October 2016, Sykes announced via Twitter that his debut studio album, Unfinished Business, would be out worldwide on 11 November 2016.

During September 2021, The Wanted returned with all 5 members of the band, up until band mate Tom Parker died in 2022.

Personal life
In the summer of 2012 he dated Dionne Bromfield. He also dated Ariana Grande from August to December 2013.

In December 2022, Sykes announced his engagement to his girlfriend, Charlotte Burke.

On his twentieth birthday, 18 April 2013, Sykes went in for surgery to remove a nodule in his throat. During episodes of The Wanted Life, he talked about his throat hurting and burning. The day manager had him see a specialist, who concluded he had a nodule on his throat and suggested that it be removed. When he recovered, he sang his solo in "I Found You" at the Summertime Ball in 2013, surprising fans when he appeared.

Filmography

Discography

Albums

Singles

Promotional singles

Music videos

Tours
Headlining
 Nathan Sykes Live (2015)

Support
 The Get Weird Tour – Little Mix (2016)
 Know-It-All headlining tour – Alessia Cara (2016)

See also
List of artists who reached number one on the US Dance Club Songs chart

References

External links 

 

 
1993 births
Living people
21st-century English singers
English child singers
English male singers
English philanthropists
English pop singers
Musicians from Gloucestershire
People from Gloucester
The Wanted members